Montrose is an unincorporated community in Jewell County, Kansas, United States.

History
A post office was first established as Delta in 1880, and the settlement was moved to the current site with the arrival of the Rock Island Railroad, and it was renamed Montrose in 1888. The origin of the name Montrose is obscure.

Education
The community is served by Rock Hills USD 107 public school district.

References

Further reading

External links
 Jewell County maps: Current, Historic, KDOT

Unincorporated communities in Jewell County, Kansas
Unincorporated communities in Kansas